The atoll moray eel (Gymnothorax atolli) is a moray eel found in coral reefs in the eastern central Pacific Ocean. It was first named by Pietschmann in 1935.

References

atoll moray eel
Fish of Hawaii
atoll moray eel
Taxa named by Viktor Pietschmann